Altenkirchen is a district in Rhineland-Palatinate, Germany. It is bounded by (from the north and clockwise) the North Rhine-Westphalian districts Rhein-Sieg, Oberbergischer Kreis, Olpe and Siegen-Wittgenstein, and the districts of Westerwaldkreis and Neuwied.

History 

The history of the district is linked with the Westerwald region.

The district was established in 1816 by the Prussian administration. It combined the county of Wildenburg and the two counties of Sayn. The former had been part of Berg, the latter ones had belonged to the duchy of Nassau.

The county used to be divided into nine mayoralties, including the Bürgermeisterei Weyerbusch.

Geography 

Altenkirchen is the northernmost district of Rhineland-Palatinate. It is occupied by the northern portions of the Westerwald mountains. The valley of the Sieg River borders the Westerwald on the north. The lands north of the Sieg are called Wildenburgisches Land, after the tiny county of Wildenburg, that once existed here.

Coat of arms 
The coat of arms displays:
 Top left: The golden lion of the county of Sayn, which occupied the territory in the 12th century
 Top right: The symbol of the tiny county of Wildenburg, which existed until 1806 in the very north of the district
 Bottom: The black and red cross is a combination of the bishops' emblems of Cologne and Trier

Towns and municipalities 

{|
! colspan=4|Verbandsgemeinden
|- valign=top
||
1. Altenkirchen-Flammersfeld
 Almersbach 
 Altenkirchen1, 2
 Bachenberg 
 Berod bei Hachenburg 
 Berzhausen 
 Birnbach 
 Bürdenbach 
 Burglahr 
 Busenhausen 
 Eichelhardt 
 Eichen 
 Ersfeld 
 Eulenberg 
 Fiersbach 
 Flammersfeld
 Fluterschen 
 Forstmehren 
 Gieleroth 
 Giershausen 
 Güllesheim 
 Hasselbach 
 Helmenzen 
 Helmeroth 
 Hemmelzen 
 Heupelzen 
 Hilgenroth 
 Hirz-Maulsbach 
 Horhausen
 Idelberg 
 Ingelbach 
 Isert 
 Kescheid 
 Kettenhausen 
||

 Kircheib
 Kraam 
 Krunkel 
 Mammelzen 
 Mehren 
 Michelbach 
 Neitersen 
 Niedersteinebach 
 Obererbach 
 Oberirsen 
 Oberlahr 
 Obersteinebach 
 Oberwambach 
 Ölsen 
 Orfgen 
 Peterslahr
 Pleckhausen 
 Racksen 
 Reiferscheid 
 Rettersen 
 Rott 
 Schöneberg 
 Schürdt 
 Seelbach 
 Seifen 
 Sörth 
 Stürzelbach 
 Volkerzen 
 Walterschen 
 Werkhausen 
 Weyerbusch 
 Willroth 
 Wölmersen 
 Ziegenhain 
||
 2. Betzdorf-Gebhardshain
 Alsdorf 
 Betzdorf1, 2
 Dickendorf
 Elben
 Elkenroth
 Fensdorf
 Gebhardshain
 Grünebach 
 Kausen
 Malberg
 Molzhain
 Nauroth
 Rosenheim
 Scheuerfeld 
 Steinebach/Sieg
 Steineroth
 Wallmenroth
 3. Daaden-Herdorf
 Daaden1
 Derschen 
 Emmerzhausen 
 Friedewald 
 Herdorf2
 Mauden 
 Niederdreisbach 
 Nisterberg 
 Schutzbach 
 Weitefeld 
||
 4. Hamm
 Birkenbeul 
 Bitzen 
 Breitscheidt 
 Bruchertseifen 
 Etzbach 
 Forst 
 Fürthen 
 Hamm (Sieg)1
 Niederirsen 
 Pracht 
 Roth 
 Seelbach bei Hamm 
 5. Kirchen
 Brachbach 
 Friesenhagen 
 Harbach 
 Kirchen1, 2
 Mudersbach 
 Niederfischbach 
6. Wissen
 Birken-Honigsessen 
 Hövels 
 Katzwinkel 
 Mittelhof 
 Selbach 
 Wissen1, 2
|-
|colspan=4 align=center|1seat of the Verbandsgemeinde; 2town
|}

References

External links 
  (German)

 
Districts of Rhineland-Palatinate